Calvi may refer to:

Places and jurisdictions

France
 Arrondissement of Calvi, Haute-Corse department, Corsica
 Calvi, Haute-Corse, a city and commune of the Haute-Corse département on the island of Corsica

Italy
 Calvi, Campania, a comune in the Province of Benevento
 Calvi dell'Umbria, a comune in the Province of Terni
 Calvi Risorta, a comune in the Province of Caserta, Campania
 Roman Catholic Diocese of Calvi, with see in the above Campanian town

Other uses 
 Calvi (surname)
 Calvi class submarine, a type of Italian submarine used during the Second World War
 Calvi (Attack on Titan), a character in the manga series Attack on Titan